Wake Pig is 3's third studio album. It was released on October 26, 2004, by Planet Noise Records. It was re-released on November 1, 2005, by Metal Blade Records. The album contains tracks that were previously featured on the band's 2003 album, Summercamp Nightmare. A music video was released for "Alien Angel" on August 10, 2006.

Track listing

Personnel
3
Joey Eppard — Lead vocals, guitar, mixing, producer, cover sculpture
Billy Riker — Guitar
Joe Cuchelo — Bass guitar
Daniel Grimsland — Bass guitar
Joe Stote — Percussion, keyboards
Chris Gartmann — Drums

Additional
Tom Benton — Executive producer
Alison Braun — Insert photography
Brian Ames — Insert design
Robert Frazza — Mixing ("Soul to Sell" and "Dregs")
Ron Fierstein — Management
Brad Vance — Mastering

Release details
2004, USA, Planet Noise Records 690193001320, Release Date 26 October 2004, CD
2005, USA, Metal Blade Records 11123347, Release Date 1 November 2005, CD

Additional information
The titular song from the album is played in the 2007 horror movie Wrong Turn 2: Dead End, in a scene featuring actors Erica Leerhsen and Texas Battle.

References

2004 albums
3 (American band) albums
Metal Blade Records albums